Hidalgo is a Spanish surname. Notable people with the surname include:

 Anne Hidalgo (born 1959), mayor of Paris
 Bartolomé Hidalgo (1788–1822), Uruguayan writer and poet
 Carlos Daniel Hidalgo (born 1986), Colombian football player
 David Hidalgo (born 1954), U.S. musician
 David Hidalgo Jr. (born 1977), U.S. drummer, son of David Hidalgo
 Diego Hidalgo Schnur (born 1942), Spanish philanthropist, intellectual and businessman
 Diego Hidalgo y Durán (1886–1961), Spanish lawyer and politician, father of Diego Hidalgo Schnur
 Elvira de Hidalgo (1891–1980), Spanish soprano singer
 Félix Resurrección Hidalgo (1855–1913), Filipino painter
 Giovanni Hidalgo (born 1963), Puerto Rican musician
 Heliodoro Hidalgo (1881–?), Cuban baseball player
 Juan Hidalgo Codorniu (born 1927), Spanish contemporary composer
 Juan Hidalgo de Polanco (1614–1685), Spanish composer and harpist
 Juan S.P. Hidalgo Jr. (born 1936), Filipino writer and painter
 Lina Hidalgo (born 1991), Colombian-American politician
 Michel Hidalgo (1933–2020), Former French football player and manager
 Miguel Hidalgo y Costilla (1753–1811), leader of the Mexican independence movement
 Montserrat Hidalgo (born 1968), Costa Rican breaststroke swimmer
 Nieves Hidalgo (born 1976), Spanish singer
 Oscar Hidalgo (born 1982), Mexican racing driver
 Pilar Hidalgo-Lim (1893–1973), Filipino educator and civic leader
 Richard Hidalgo (born 1975), Venezuelan MLB player
 Rubén Ramírez Hidalgo (born 1978), Spanish tennis player
 Sam Hidalgo-Clyne (born 1993), Scottish rugby union player

See also
 Hidalgo (disambiguation)

Spanish-language surnames